Thomas Lewis O'Beirne (1749 – 17 February 1823), was an Anglican bishop, Bishop of Ossory from 1795 to 1798 when he was translated to Meath.

Life
Born in 1749, the eldest son of a Roman Catholic farmer, he was educated at the Catholic College of St Omer before converting to Anglicanism. Ordained a priest in 1773, he was entered on the books of Trinity College, Cambridge as a ten-year man the same year.

His ecclesiastical career began with a college living at Grendon, Northamptonshire 1774–1776, following which he was a naval chaplain under Admiral Howe in 1776. In 1776 he preached in St. Paul's Church in New York City. Later he was Vicar of West Deeping 1779-1783 and chaplain and private secretary to the Duke of Portland 1782–1783.

Returning to his native Ireland he became the incumbent at Templemichael, from which post he ascended to the episcopate: He became Anglican bishop of Ossory in 1795, and in 1798 was transferred to the see of Meath.

He died on 17 February 1823.

Notes

1749 births
1823 deaths
Alumni of Trinity College, Cambridge
18th-century Anglican bishops in Ireland
19th-century Anglican bishops in Ireland
Anglican bishops of Ossory
Anglican bishops of Meath
Members of the Privy Council of Ireland
Irish military chaplains
Royal Navy chaplains